Quercus frainetto (synonyms Quercus conferta, Quercus farnetto), commonly known as the Hungarian oak or Italian oak, is a species of oak, native to southeastern Europe (parts of Italy, the Balkans, parts of Hungary, Romania) and Turkey. It is classified in Quercus sect. Quercus.

Description
The bark is light gray in colour and cracks into small square cracking plates. The buds are large, long and pointed, shiny russet or light brown in colour with minute tomentum. The twigs are stout and covered with russet upward pointed hairs.

The leaf stalks are usually short, rarely to 22 mm, long. The leaves are widest close to the apex, which is broad and short pointed. The base of the leaf usually has auricles which sometimes overlap the twig. The light yellow green expanding leaves turn rich dark green by the beginning of summer. The leaves are covered with minute russet hairs, especially the lower surface. The leaves are concentrated at the ends of twigs. The leaves turn brown, russet or yellow in fall and sometimes remain attached to the twigs until the following spring.

The light brown acorns mature in about 6 months. The acorn cup is covered with long overlapping scales and russet hairs. The acorns tend to concentrate in groups of two to eight at the ends of twigs.

Distribution and habitat

The centre of the tree's native range is in the Balkans. It is adapted to the subcontinental climate of southeastern Europe, but the main factor of its occurrence at a particular site is the soil. It is specially adapted to heavy acidic soils (cambisols and vertisols), typical of Kosovo, Serbia, Bulgaria and Romania. These soils are usually leached out, very dry in the summer and sometimes waterlogged in the spring. However, the Hungarian oak does not tolerate flooding or high water tables. It is also extremely sensitive to the presence of lime in the soil. Hence, in contradiction to its English vernacular name, which was assigned when Hungary was a much larger kingdom, the Hungarian oak is a very rare tree in modern Hungary, where the soils are generally very rich in lime. The Hungarian oak-Turkey oak forest (Quercetum frainetto-cerris Rud.) is the most widespread association of this oak in the Balkans, which is also the most common forest type in Serbia and Kosovo.

Cultivation
This tree is cultivated in parks and large gardens, and the cultivar 'Hungarian Crown' has gained the Royal Horticultural Society's Award of Garden Merit.

References

 Bean, W. J. (1976). Trees and shrubs hardy in the British Isles 8th ed., revised. John Murray.
 
 Rushforth, K. (1999). Trees of Britain and Europe. HarperCollins .
  Chênes: Quercus frainetto

External links
 Quercus frainetto - information, genetic conservation units and related resources. European Forest Genetic Resources Programme (EUFORGEN)

frainetto
Flora of Europe
Flora of Italy
Plants described in 1813
Flora of Turkey
Medicinal plants
Trees of Mediterranean climate
Trees of Europe
Trees of humid continental climate
Garden plants of Europe
Ornamental trees
Flora of Montenegro